The 2019/20 FIS Cup (ski jumping) was the 15th FIS Cup season in ski jumping for men and the 8th for ladies.

Other competitive circuits this season include the World Cup, Grand Prix, Continental Cup, FIS Race and Alpen Cup.

Calendar

Men

Ladies

Overall standings

Men

Ladies

References 

2019 in ski jumping
2020 in ski jumping
FIS Cup (ski jumping)